A karanga (call out, summon) is an element of cultural protocol of the Māori people of Aotearoa New Zealand. It is an exchange of calls that forms part of the pōwhiri, a Māori welcoming ceremony. It takes place as a visiting group moves onto the marae or into the formal meeting area. Karanga are carried out almost exclusively by women and in Māori language, and are initiated by the tangata whenua or hosts, and responded to by the visitors.

Karanga follow a particular format in keeping with protocol. This includes exchanging greetings, paying tribute to the dead (especially those who have most recently died), and referring to the reason for the groups' coming together. It has an important function in building connections between tangata whenua and manuhiri (guests), and setting the agenda for the gathering.

See also

Karakia

Sources 
Karanga - Korero Maori
Audio recording, words and music notation of a karanga
Definition of karakia in Te Papakupu o te Taitokerau on the website Te Māra Reo

Māori culture
Māori words and phrases